Bandala is a valley in Azad Kashmir located about 28 kilometres from Bhimber in Azad Kashmir. The valley stretches from the river Tawi in the east to the Samahni valley in the west. The Reech Pahari (Bear Mountain) runs parallel on the northern side and the Baghsar mountain on the southern side. The valley is about 15 kilometres long and about 1.5 kilometres wide.

Bandala joins the valley of Samahni at Sara e Saadabad and Chitti Mitti, further east are Kahawalian and Nali villages, the last villages before the Line of Control. Many streams flow through the valley, producing cascades, rapids, falls and natural swimming pools. These pools are very popular among the local youths, not only for swimming but also for fishing. The fertile land and mild climate produces a variety of crops or trees, especially mango trees. Farming is still the major source of staple food for the area; wheat and corn are grown annually. The high literacy rate has improved the overall living standards of the people. Because most of the people work for the government or overseas, especially in Middle East and Europe, dependence on farming for income has greatly reduced but people still cultivate the land for food.
The weather is too much cold during October to march,  with freezing cold, and mild during April and May. During June it is a bit hot with 35 Celsius temperature.
Many birds and animals are found in the valley including peacocks, partridges, quail, falcons and eagles. The enclosing Reech Pahari serves as the sanctuary for many animal species including leopards, hyenas, wolves, jackals, Foxes, pythons, monkeys, deer.
The valley is home to many hamlets, of which Bandi, Pind, Gurah, Piana, Parati, Kahawalian, Bagh Chagah jandala and penga are the best known.

Valleys of Azad Kashmir